Screamer is a family of bird species.

Screamer may also refer to:

Books 
 Screamer magazine, a Los Angeles area music publication
 Screamers, a Hardy Boys novel

Entertainment 
 Screamer (video game), a PC racing game series
 "Screamers" (Beavis and Butt-head episode)

Film 
 Screamers (1995 film), a film based on the short story "Second Variety" by Philip K. Dick
 Screamers (2006 film), a documentary by Carla Garapedian and System of a Down
 #Screamers (2016 film), an American horror-mystery film
 Screamers (1979 film), directed by Sergio Martino

Music 
 Screamer, a member of a musical ensemble designated to provide screamed vocals
 Screamer (march), a style of march music used in circus marches
 Ibanez Tube Screamer, an overdrive pedal in electronic sound effects
 The Screamers, an electropunk band from 1975–1981
 Screamer (album) by Third Eye Blind, 2019
 "Screamer", a 2000 song by Good Charlotte from Good Charlotte
 "Screamer", a 2019 song by Third Eye Blind from Screamer

Places
 Screamer, Alabama
 Screamer, Tennessee
 Screamer Mountain, a mountain in Rabun County, Georgia

Transportation 
 Armstrong Siddeley Screamer, a rocket engine intended to power the Avro 720 interceptor aircraft
 EMD F40PH or Screamer, a locomotive
 Screamer pipe, in automobile modification
 WDM-2, Indian Railways locomotive, when the horn has a very high-pitched sound

Other uses 
 Internet screamer, an image or video that unexpectedly frightens the viewer
 Spectacular mark or screamer,  a type of mark in Australian rules football
The Screamers, a name for the primal therapy commune Atlantis

See also